Seobinggo-dong is a dong, neighbourhood of Yongsan-gu in Seoul, South Korea. It is directly across the river from Banpo-dong, Seocho-gu, with the Banpo Bridge connecting the two neighbourhoods.

Its Hanja name literally means "west ice storage house", a reference to the area's historic ice storage houses. In the past, ice had to be cut of the frozen Han River during the winter and stored in ice houses for use during the summer. The Seobinggo was opened by King Taejo during the early years of the Joseon Dynasty; the Dongbinggo ("east ice storage house") was likewise opened in present-day Oksu-dong, Seongdong-gu. The ice storage industry died out with the introduction of refrigeration technology during the 1950s but a marker at Seobinggo-ro 51-gil and an information sign at across the river at Hangang Banpo Park were erected to commemorate the area's history and importance.

See also 
Administrative divisions of South Korea

References

External links
 Yongsan-gu official website
 Yongsan-gu official website
 Seobinggo-dong resident office website

Neighbourhoods of Yongsan District